Badarán is a village in the province and autonomous community of La Rioja, Spain.

History
Prehistoric remains have been found within the municipal area of Badarán showing the existence of people in the area during the Palaeolithic period. There were also later settlements in Roman times.

The town was founded on the road that linked the Monastery of San Millán de la Cogolla, with Nájera. The name of the nucleus is Basque in origin and is composed of two very identifiable words, according to Basque analysts, bad ('one or first') and Aran ('valley'), being defined as 'the first in the valley', referring to the location of the village in the River Cardenas valley.

The first written document in which it appears is a deed of gift of the location to the Monastery of San Millán in the tenth century. There were three villages near Badarán called Villagonzalo, Terrero and Villorquite. On 15 May 1326 the four locations merged to form the current municipality of Badarán. The Privilege of the Union was requested by the Abbot of San Millán, Diego Lopez, from King Alfonso XI of Castile, who granted it in Burgos.

Population
In 2010 the population increased to 626 inhabitants, 330 men and 296 women.

References

Populated places in La Rioja (Spain)